The Algerian Basketball Championship, now called the ABC National 1 and formally known as the ABC Super Division, is the pre-eminent men's basketball league in Algeria. National 1 is contested by 16 teams, with the two lowest-placed teams relegated to the Second Division and replaced by the two playoff winners. From 1963 onwards, MC Alger (21 titles) and WA Boufarik (9 titles) both dominated. Darak El-Watani won 11 titles but no longer exists.

Play history
Before Algeria's independence, there were several regional leagues led by the French federation. The Algerian Basketball Championship was founded in 1962 when the country achieved independence. The first, second, and third championships were won by ASM Oran in 1963, 1964, and 1965, respectively. Capital clubs began dominating the championship starting in the 1965-66 season. USM Alger  won three titles (1966, 1967, and 1969) over the next few years, with RAM Alger breaking their win streak by winning in 1968. Darak El-Watani pulled ahead with 11 titles, including six consecutive wins between 1977 and 1982. MP Alger won four times in the mid-1980s, and again in 1988-1989 under the name MC Alger. WA Boufarik won five consecutive titles between 1990 and 1994 and an additional three between 1997 and 1999. IRB Alger (later renamed OC Alger) broke the first streak by winning the championships in 1994-95 and 1995-96. WA Boufarik also won four Algerian Basketball Cups in the 1990s.

The GS Pétroliers dominated the first 20 years of the 2000s, first as MC Alger with titles in the 1999-2000 and 2000-01 seasons; four consecutive wins between 2003 and 2006; and one in 2007-08. The team started its run under its new name, MC Alger, with three consecutive wins (2009 to 2012), punctuated by a loss to CSM Constantine, and another six consecutive wins (2013 to 2019) before the COVID-19 pandemic interrupted play. 

In the 2006-07 season, there were six teams: WA Boufarik, CRB Dar El-Beida, WB Aïn Bénian, AS PTT Alger, MC Alger, and NB Staouéli. In the sixth minute of the second quarter of a mini-championship playoff game against DRB Staouéli, MC Alger left the court while the score was 28-21 in favor of DRB Staouéli. International referee Noureddine Chachoua awarded MC Alger a loss by penalty, allowing DRB Staouéli to win the championship for the first time. Two seasons later, AS PPT Alger also won the title after defeating GS Pétroliers in a mini-championship 2nd tournament playoff in Hydra. At halftime, the score was 45-31 and increased to 81-81 by the end of the game with three seconds left. Faycal Belkhodja was able to score three points, taking the win for GS Pétroliers. 

The final match (best of three) system, which had been absent for most of the early 2000s, returned in the 2010–11 season. The GS Pétroliers swept CRB Dar Beida in the finals. The competition system changed again; now, a tournament of 16 clubs would play 30 matches each. The club that came first in points was crowned champion. The GS Pétroliers beat US Sétif (107–65) to win their second consecutive title. They also won the Algerian Basketball Cup for the second consecutive time. 

The 2012-13 season brought another competition system change. Twenty clubs returned and four new ones joined. They were divided into groups A and B, with each group playing 18 matches as part of phase one. In phase two, the first four teams of each group moved on to the playoffs. The remaining teams were up for relegation. CSM Constantine beat GS Pétroliers 2-1 and won the title for the first time. The team went on to represent Algeria at the 2013 FIBA Africa Clubs Champions Cup. By the start of the next season, CSM Constantine had lost most of its star players and GS Pétroliers returned to win the title for four consecutive seasons, in addition to four consecutive cup wins. Due to its winning streak and sponsorship from Sonatrach, GS Pétroliers was the only club not to struggle with financial issues in the early 2010s.

Clubs

The following is a list of clubs that participated in the 2021-22 season:

Title holders
Below is the list of the champions since the first edition in 1962-63. MC Alger and WA Boufarik have historically been rivals due to both teams' high win count.

 1962-63: ASM Oran 
 1963-64: ASM Oran  
 1964-65: ASM Oran  
 1965-66: USM Alger 
 1966-67: USM Alger  
 1967-68: RAM Alger  
 1968-69: USM Alger  
 1969-70: Darak El-Watani 
 1970-71: CSS Kouba 
 1971-72: Darak El-Watani  
 1972-73: Darak El-Watani  
 1973-74: Darak El-Watani  
 1974-75: Darak El-Watani  
 1975-76: CS DNC Alger 
 1976-77: Darak El-Watani  
 1977-78: Darak El-Watani   
 1978-79: Darak El-Watani  
 1979-80: Darak El-Watani  
 1980-81: Darak El-Watani  
 1981-82: Darak El-Watani  
 1982-83: MP Alger 
 1983-84: MP Oran 
 1984-85: MP Alger  
 1985-86: MP Alger  
 1986-87: MP Alger  
 1987-88: IRB Alger 
 1988-89: MP Alger  
 1989-90: WA Boufarik 
 1990-91: WA Boufarik  
 1991-92: WA Boufarik  
 1992-93: WA Boufarik  
 1993-94: WA Boufarik 
 1994-95: IRB Alger 
 1995-96: IRB/ECT Alger 
 1996-97: WA Boufarik 
 1997-98: WA Boufarik  
 1998-99: WA Boufarik 
 1999-2000: MC Alger 
 2000-01: MC Alger 
 2001-02: WA Boufarik 
 2002-03: MC Alger 
 2003-04: MC Alger 
 2004-05: MC Alger 
 2005-06: MC Alger 
 2006-07: DRB Staouéli
 2007-08: MC Alger 
 2008-09: AS PTT Alger
 2009-10: GS Pétroliers 
 2010-11: GS Pétroliers 
 2011-12: GS Pétroliers 
 2012-13: CSM Constantine
 2013-14: GS Pétroliers 
 2014-15: GS Pétroliers 
 2015-16: GS Pétroliers 
 2016-17: GS Pétroliers 
 2017-18: GS Pétroliers 
 2018-19: GS Pétroliers 
 2019-20: cancelled
 2020-21: cancelled
 2021-22: NB Staoueli 
 2022-23: TBD

League championships by club

ABC National 1 seasons and finals from 1995

See also 
 Algerian Basketball Cup
 Algerian Women's Basketball Cup

References

External links 
 Algerian Basketball Federation official website
 1st Basketball website in Algeria
 Algerian Basketball - Afrobasket.com

 

 
Basketball competitions in Algeria
Basketball leagues in Africa
Basketball
1962 establishments in Algeria